Safet Nadarević (born 30 August 1980) is a retired Bosnian footballer who last played for NK Jedinstvo Bihać.

Club career
Nadarević started his career at NK Jedinstvo Bihać. He then played for FK Sarajevo and NK Zagreb before joining Eskişehirspor in June 2008, on a 3-year contract.

On 29 August 2012, Nadarević signed a one-year contract with NK Zagreb.
On 27 September 2013, Nadarević signed for NK Jedinstvo Bihać

International career
Nadarević made his debut for Bosnia and Herzegovina in a June 2001 Merdeka Tournament match against Bahrain and has earned a total of 30 caps, scoring no goals. His final international was a September 2010 European Championship qualification match against France.

References

External links

1980 births
Living people
People from Cazin
Association football central defenders
Bosnia and Herzegovina footballers
Bosnia and Herzegovina international footballers
NK Jedinstvo Bihać players
FK Sarajevo players
NK Zagreb players
Eskişehirspor footballers
Premier League of Bosnia and Herzegovina players
Croatian Football League players
Süper Lig players
First League of the Federation of Bosnia and Herzegovina players
Bosnia and Herzegovina expatriate footballers
Expatriate footballers in Croatia
Bosnia and Herzegovina expatriate sportspeople in Croatia
Expatriate footballers in Turkey
Bosnia and Herzegovina expatriate sportspeople in Turkey
Bosnia and Herzegovina football managers
NK Jedinstvo Bihać managers